Kennington Common was a swathe of common land mainly within the London Borough of Lambeth. It was one of the earliest venues for cricket around London, with matches played between 1724 and 1785. The common was also used for public executions, fairs and public gatherings. Important orators spoke there, addressing crowds numbering tens of thousands.

Early history
In 1600, the common was bounded on the south west by Vauxhall Creek. The common extended over marshy land to the south west of the Roman road called Stane Street, now Kennington Park Road. There is a 1660 record of a common keeper being paid for grazing. In 1661, the Vauxhall Pleasure Gardens were laid out nearby (its location is noted as the Vauxhall End at The Oval). The large open space was often used for a variety of purposes by people living on the south bank of the River Thames.

Cricket venue

Cricket has been played at Kennington since the early 18th century. The earliest recorded match at the venue was a London v Dartford match in June 1724. The following year players were known to have used the Horns tavern as their clubhouse and in August 1726, a combined London and Surrey XI played a side led by Edwin Stead for a purse of 25 guineas. Matches were played on the common throughout the 18th century. A London v Sevenoaks game on 12 July 1731 is the first known to have been played in an enclosed ground.

From the late 1730s, the London club increasingly used the Artillery Ground for home matches and the common became one of several home venues used by Surrey sides.

Other sports
Other sports to have been periodically played on the common included quoits and bowls.

Mass meetings

People would gather at the common to listen to public speakers, both religious and political. In 1739, the Methodists John Wesley and George Whitefield preached to an audience of 30,000.

On 10 April 1848, Irish Chartist leader Feargus O'Connor addressed up to 50,000 people over a petition in support of the Land Plan.

Executions 
The Surrey gallows were where now stands St. Mark's Church, not far from Oval tube station. These could be used the for the whole county but were overwhelmingly a south London equivalent of Tyburn as the global city's urbanisation had already swept into the county of Surrey (before the formation of the London County Council 90 years after its last execution). Public executions were conducted frequently in years when the common was also hosting matches. At least 129 men and 12 women were executed on site. The first person was Sarah Elston who was burned at the stake on 24 April 1678 for the killing her husband. The last person executed was a forger on 5 August 1799.

In 1746, the Jacobite officer Francis Towneley, along with other members of the Manchester Regiment, who had been captured during the failed Jacobite rising of 1745, were convicted of high treason and condemned to be hanged, drawn and quartered on the common on 30 July. However, by then executioners possessed some discretion as to how much the condemned should suffer before death. Towneley was killed before his body was eviscerated. His head was placed on a pike on Temple Bar.

Demise and The Oval
 
The common continued to stage executions until the end of the 18th century while fairs, orators and other popular events continued into the 19th century.

The lords of the manor and church of the parish were allowed to enclose some of the commons the land in the 19th century. Under a scheme sponsored by the royal family, the remainder of the common was enclosed in the mid 19th century. Kennington Park, which opened in 1854, was created using the land between Kennington Park Road and St Agnes Place. In the marked growth of London until World War I, it was reduced to about its current size.

Cricket remains at Kennington. In 1845 the newly formed Surrey County Cricket Club established The Oval (formerly the Kennington Oval) on part of the old common that was used as a market garden.

References

1724 establishments in England
Common land in London
Cricket grounds in Surrey
Defunct cricket grounds in England
Defunct sports venues in Surrey
English cricket venues in the 18th century
History of Surrey
Sports venues completed in 1724